is a Japanese manga series written and illustrated by Hakuri. The manga was first published in Square Enix and Pixiv's web manga magazine Gangan Pixiv since February 22, 2017 and reached more than 75 million viewers as of June 2017. A television drama adaptation starring Anna Yamada and Shūhei Uesugi premiered on TV Asahi July 8, 2018. The official English title of the drama adaptation is A Little Room for Hope.

Plot
An unnamed 14-year-old girl who is physically abused by her parents, sexually abused by her teacher, and bullied by her classmates decides to commit suicide, but is stopped by an unnamed man who always wears a mask. She decides to run away to live with the man and begins calling him "Mister." He gives her the name Sachi, meaning happiness. The police treat her disappearance as a kidnapping, and begin searching for the two. They make a pact that if they can escape from the police they will get married, but if they get caught they will end their life.

Characters

Portrayed by: Shuhei Uesugi
This character whose name and age are unknown is a man who always covers his face with a mask, and is notable for his silver-colored hair. He first appears as Sachi's "stalker"—he took a lot of pictures of her and put them on a wall at his home. After saving Sachi from committing suicide, he decided to give Sachi a chance to "taste happiness" while doubting whether what he does—kidnapping her—is the right thing to do. He reveals in chapter 43 that he was once called Haru.

Portrayed by: Inori Minase (TVCM), Anna Yamada (TV series)
Sachi is a 14-year-old victim of her abusive parents and was bullied by her friends at school. Sick of her own life, she decides to end her own life before the "older brother" saved her life. Her current name is given by the "Mister," and the kanji of her name comes from the word "happiness," which Sachi always adored.

Media

Manga
11 compilation volumes have been released. The series concluded with its 11th installment in December 2022

Volume list

Television drama
A live-action drama adaptation started broadcasting on July 8, 2018 in TV Asahi. The drama starred Anna Yamada and Shuhei Uesugi as Sachi and "Older brother" respectively. It is the second work to be aired in TV Asahi's "Drama L" slot. Five-piece band Flow performs the theme song titled

Reception
In 2017, the series won third place in Pixiv and Nippon Shuppan Hanbai, Inc's Web Manga General Election.

References

External links
Official page at Pixiv Comic 
Live action official website 

Manga series